is a passenger railway station located in the city of Kunitachi, Tokyo, Japan, operated by East Japan Railway Company (JR East).

Lines
Kunitachi Station is served by the Chūō Line (Rapid). It is 34.5 kilometers from the terminus of the line at Tokyo Station.

Station layout
The station has one elevated side platform (platform 1) and one island platform (platforms 2 and 3), serving a total of three tracks. The station has a Midori no Madoguchi staffed ticket office.

Platforms

History

Kunitachi Station opened on 1 April 1926. With the privatization of Japanese National Railways (JNR) on 1 April 1987, the station came under the control of JR East.

Passenger statistics
In fiscal 2019, the JR station was used by an average of 53,532 passengers daily (boarding passengers only) making it the 67th busiest JR East station.

Surrounding area
 Railway Technical Research Institute
 Hitotsubashi University Kunitachi campus

See also

 List of railway stations in Japan

References

External links

 JR East station information 

Chūō Main Line
Stations of East Japan Railway Company
Railway stations in Tokyo
Railway stations in Japan opened in 1926
Kunitachi, Tokyo